Enigma is a 1995 novel by Robert Harris about Tom Jericho, a young mathematician trying to break the Germans' "Enigma" ciphers during World War II. Jericho is stationed in Bletchley Park, the British cryptologist central office, and is worked to the point of physical and mental exhaustion.  The book was adapted to film in 2001.

Plot (from the book. The plot in the film is different)
In February 1943, Tom Jericho, a gifted cryptanalyst at Bletchley Park, is recuperating in Cambridge from a nervous breakdown brought on by the pressures of work and the breakup of his relationship with Claire Romilly, a cipher clerk. After a few weeks, he is told Bletchley needs him back since it has become locked out of the Naval Enigma. Back at Bletchley, Jericho is still infatuated with Claire and makes his way to her lodgings, only to be told by her flatmate Hester Wallace that Claire is not there.

Jericho waits for Hester to leave and lets himself in to rifle through Claire's possessions. He discovers that her bedroom floorboards have been recently replaced. Beneath them he finds a sheaf of unsolved cryptograms, which he takes. He goes to leave but notices a male figure arrive at the cottage and flee at the sight of him.

Jericho discusses the Enigma lockout with Jozef "Puck" Pukowski, an Anglo-Polish cryptanalyst who fled Poland after the invasion by Germany and so left his family behind. Jericho realises that the way back into the Naval Enigma can be made through collecting 'contact codes', abbreviated reports made by a U-boat when it discovers a convoy. In the meantime, Claire has gone missing. Jericho's attempt to phone her father, Edward Romilly, is rebuffed. He approaches her flatmate Hester and the two learn that the cryptograms that Jericho found had originated from Smolensk, in the German-occupied Soviet Union. Hester discovers that the cryptograms were part of a series sent to German Army High Command but that interception and decryption of the signals at Bletchley were abruptly terminated by a high authority for unknown reasons. Hester and Jericho bluff their way into a signals-receiving station and purloin copies of the full set of undeciphered signals.

Back at Bletchley, Jericho joins the effort at deciphering contact reports and eventually produces a 'menu' for the cryptanalytic 'bombes' to work upon. He slips out and secretly deciphers the stolen cryptograms with the Enigma settings that Hester has obtained. From them, he learns that the Germans have discovered thousands of bodies buried in the Katyn Forest. The corpses are those of Polish officers who must have been murdered by Britain's ally, the Soviet Union, which invaded eastern Poland in 1939. Another cryptogram proves to be a list of abbreviated Polish names; he continues deciphering until he discovers a familiar name: Pukowski, T. He realises that to be Puck's missing father and that Claire stole the cryptograms to bring to Puck, her secret lover.

Claire's bloodstained clothing is found near a flooded gravel pit. Jericho calls at Puck's lodgings but discovers that Puck has escaped and made for the railway station. Jericho follows him there and secretly boards the same train. He confronts Puck, who confesses to Claire's murder before he shoots the ticket inspector and jumps from the train. Jericho chases him, but Puck is fatally shot by MI5 agents who had boarded the same train, and Jericho is also wounded. Recuperating in hospital, Jericho is told by MI5 officer Wigram that Puck, outraged by the murder of his father, had been preparing to defect to Germany to bring proof that Bletchley had broken Enigma. Claire's father's absence from her funeral tells Jericho that she is not really dead. In London, he obtains the death certificate of one Claire Romilly, the daughter of Edward Romilly who died in childhood. He confronts Romilly and learns from him that the woman whom he knew as Claire Romilly was Wigram's agent at Bletchley and was sent under a false identity to find the suspected mole there. 'Claire' agreed with Puck to stage her death, but both had different motives for doing so. Now back with MI5, she is alive, but Jericho knows that he will never see her again. Less troubled by the prospect than he might once have been, he returns to Cambridge and sends a letter inviting Hester to meet him there.

Characters
 Tom Jericho: a brilliant mathematician and cryptanalyst recruited to the Government Code and Cypher School at Bletchley Park. A delicate and sensitive man, he suffers a nervous breakdown from the pressures.
 Claire Romilly: an MI5 officer placed at Bletchley to uncover a mole there. Her real name is unknown; she takes the pseudonym Claire Romilly from a girl who died in childhood. She and Tom have a short-lived relationship.
 Hester Wallace: Claire's flatmate, an intelligent woman who resents the sexism that has confined her to a menial role at Bletchley.
 Jozef "Puck" Pukowski: an Anglo-Polish cryptanalyst who fled Poland when Germany invaded. A handsome man, he has little trouble finding female company at Bletchley, including Claire.
 Mr Wigram: an MI5 officer and Claire's controller. Suspecting the existence of a mole at Bletchley, he places Claire there to root him out.

Reception
The book, though fiction, is criticised by people who were at Bletchley Park as bearing little resemblance to the real wartime Bletchley Park.

Edition
1st UK edition, Hutchinson, 1995. 
1st US edition, Random House, 1995.

See also

References

1995 British novels
Novels set during World War II
Novels about submarine warfare
Novels by Robert Harris
British thriller novels
Secret histories
English novels
Random House books
Novels set in Buckinghamshire
Hutchinson (publisher) books
Enigma machine
British novels adapted into films
Novels about cryptography